The 2013 Pacific Netball series was held in Samoa between 4-6 June 2013.

Results

Table

Final standings

See also
 Pacific Netball Series

References

Pacific
2013
2013 in Oceanian sport
International netball competitions hosted by Samoa
2013 in Cook Islands sport
2013 in Fijian sport
2013 in Papua New Guinean sport
2013 in Samoan sport